The term median raphe can refer to one of three different anatomical structures:
 The pharyngeal raphe
 The perineal raphe, also known as the "median r. of perineum"
 The palatine raphe